The Maverick Queen is a 1956 American Western film in Trucolor starring Barbara Stanwyck as the title character and Barry Sullivan as an undercover Pinkerton detective out to stop outlaws Butch Cassidy, the Sundance Kid, and the Wild Bunch. It was the first film made in Republic's widescreen process Naturama. The film is based on the novel of the same name by Zane Grey.

Plot
A stranger, calling himself Jeff Young, imposes on rancher Lucy Lee for a meal and a night's rest, then saves her from being robbed. Jeff helps deliver her cattle to town, where he encounters Kit Banion running her saloon, The Maverick Queen.

Kit is secretly in cahoots with the notorious Hole in the Wall Gang, led by Butch Cassidy and Sundance, and a jealous Sundance is angered when Jeff beats him at poker and attracts romantic interest from Kit, who offers Jeff a job as a faro dealer. He reveals he is actually Jeff Younger, a relative of the Younger Gang outlaws, and wants to help Kit and her associates with their illegal holdups.

Lucy is held captive by Sundance after a train robbery, and Jeff ends up killing him to save her. Holding off the other outlaws while their cabin is on fire, Jeff is helped by Kit, who is shot and dies in his arms. The posse arrives, whereupon Jeff confesses that he is actually a Pinkerton detective, working undercover to catch the thieves.

Cast
 Barbara Stanwyck as Kit Banion
 Barry Sullivan as Jeff Young / Younger
 Scott Brady as Sundance
 Mary Murphy as Lucy Lee
 Wallace Ford as Jamie
 Howard Petrie as Butch Cassidy
 Jim Davis as The Stranger, the real Jeff Younger
 Emile Meyer as Leo Malone
 Walter Sande as Sheriff Wilson
 George Keymas as Muncie
 John Doucette as Loudmouth
 Taylor Holmes as Pete Callaher
 Pierre Watkin as McMillan
 Joni James as Title Song Singer
 Jack Kenny as Barfly (uncredited) 
 Ethan Laidlaw as Henchman (uncredited)

See also
 List of American films of 1956
 List of American films of 1955

External links
 
 
 

1956 films
1956 Western (genre) films
1950s historical films
American Western (genre) films
American historical films
American romantic drama films
Films based on American novels
Films directed by Joseph Kane
Films scored by Victor Young
Republic Pictures films
Trucolor films
1950s English-language films
1950s American films